Chahar Taq (also Romanized as Chahār Ţāq; also known as Chatak and Shamsābād-e Chahār Ţāq) is a village in Mohammadabad Rural District, in the Central District of Marvdasht County, Fars Province, Iran. At the 2006 census, its population was 662, in 149 families.

References 

Populated places in Marvdasht County